Leucophlebia edentata is a moth of the family Sphingidae. It is found from Guinea east to Sudan and Uganda.

References

Leucophlebia
Moths described in 1916